The Nanticoke Lodge No. 172, A.F. and A.M. is a historic mixed-use commercial building at 112-116 North Main Street in Federalsburg, Maryland.  The two story terra cotta brick building was erected in 1919-20 by local Masonic groups.  It housed retail operations on the first floor, and a large auditorium for lodge functions on the second.  It is one of two surviving purpose-built Masonic buildings in Caroline County.  Its upper floor lodge spaces have well-preserved period detailing.

The building was listed on the National Register of Historic Places in 2014.

See also
National Register of Historic Places listings in Caroline County, Maryland

References

Buildings and structures in Caroline County, Maryland
Commercial buildings on the National Register of Historic Places in Maryland
Clubhouses on the National Register of Historic Places in Maryland
National Register of Historic Places in Caroline County, Maryland
1920 establishments in Maryland
Buildings and structures completed in 1920